The Carol Weymuller Open is an annual women's squash tournament that takes place in Brooklyn, New York, United States in September. It is part of the WSA World Tour.

Past Results

Women's

References

External links
Carol Weymuller official website